Folketing elections were held in Denmark on 4 August 1852. Although the National Liberal Party became the largest party, Christian Albrecht Bluhme of the Højre party remained Prime Minister after the elections.

Electoral system
The elections were held using first-past-the-post voting in single-member constituencies. Only 15% of the population was eligible to vote in the elections, with suffrage restricted to men over 30 who were not receiving poor relief (or who had not paid back any previous poor relief received), were not classed as "dependents" (those who were privately employed but did not have a household) and who had lived in their constituency for a certain length of time.

Results

References

1852 in Denmark
Elections in Denmark
Denmark
Denmark